Alvaredo Church is a Roman Catholic church in the Shrine of Saint Martin in Alvaredo, Melgaço, Portugal.

References

Sao Martinho
Buildings and structures in Melgaço, Portugal